Rachel Balkovec (born July 5, 1987) is an American minor league baseball manager in the New York Yankees organization. In 2022, the Yankees named Balkovec manager of their Class A minor league team, the Tampa Tarpons, making her the first woman to work as a full-time manager of a major league-affiliated team.

Early life 
Balkovec grew up in Omaha, Nebraska. She has two sisters. Her father worked as a customer service manager for American Airlines, and her mother was a bookkeeper.

As a student at Skutt Catholic High School in Omaha, Balkovec played softball, soccer, and basketball. She initially attended Creighton University, where she was a catcher on the Creighton Bluejays softball team, but transferred to the University of New Mexico, where she also played catcher for the New Mexico Lobos. She graduated from New Mexico in 2009 with a bachelor's degree in exercise science. She then earned her master's degree from Louisiana State University in kinesiology. In 2018, she enrolled in Vrije University in the Netherlands to study human movement sciences, earning her second master's degree.

Career 
Balkovec began her career in 2012 as a temporary contract strength and conditioning coach for the Johnson City Cardinals, the Rookie league affiliate of the St. Louis Cardinals. In that role, she won the Appalachian League's award for strength coach of the year. In 2014, she assumed a full-time role as Johnson City affiliate's strength and conditioning coordinator, the first time a woman had held that role in baseball. 

In 2016, Balkovec was hired by the Houston Astros to be their Latin American strength and conditioning coordinator. She learned Spanish for the position, so she could better communicate with players. She was the first woman in that role in Major League Baseball. In 2018, she was promoted to be the Class AA Corpus Christi Hooks' strength and conditioning coach.

After moving to the Netherlands to pursue a second master's degree at Vrije University, Balkovec worked for the Dutch baseball and softball programs as an assistant hitting coach. After graduating, she returned to the United States to work at a fellowship at Driveline Baseball, researching hitters' eye tracking and pitchers' hip movement.

In November 2019, Balkovec was announced as the New York Yankees' newest Minor League hitting coach, to start in spring training 2020, again the first woman to hold such a position full-time. She also interviewed for a position s a quality control coach with the San Francisco Giants in fall 2019, but decided to take the Yankees' role. 

Since the COVID-19 pandemic canceled the 2020 Minor League Baseball season, she coached in the Australian Baseball League. She was part of the coaching staff of the 2021 All-Star Futures Game.

On January 11, 2022, the Yankees announced that Balkovec would manage the Low-A Tampa Tarpons in 2022, making her the first woman to manage in affiliated baseball. On April 8, 2022, the Tarpons defeated the Lakeland Flying Tigers 9-6, earning Balkovec her first win in her managerial debut in affiliated baseball.

Overcoming gender challenges 
In 2013, she was waitressing and working at Lululemon, hoping to advance her coaching career, but after applying to 15 different teams in Phoenix and not hearing back, she changed her name on her resume and her email address from "Rachel" to "Rae". Rather than emphasize she had been a Division I college softball catcher, she only said she had been a Division I college catcher. This led to phone interviews, but once people heard her voice, the only offers were for women's sports, Balkovec says. One team, she says, told her they would never hire a woman.

See also
 Women in baseball

References 

1987 births
Living people
American sportswomen
Creighton Bluejays softball players
Louisiana State University alumni
New Mexico Lobos softball players
Minor league baseball coaches
Vrije Universiteit Amsterdam alumni
Sportspeople from Omaha, Nebraska